London is a 2004 three-part BBC history documentary series about the history of London, presented by Peter Ackroyd.

Episodes

1: Fire and Destiny
(7 May 2004)
Boudicca, Great Fire of London, Blitz,

2: Crowd
(14 May 2004)
Riots, Peasants' Revolt, Gordon Riots

3: Water and Darkness
(21 May 2004)
Sewers, River Thames, London Bridge, Springheeled Jack

Cast list
The series made a visual trope of, as Ackroyd walked around London or was sitting in his study, the persons of famous and anonymous historical figures would fade in and out and act their testimonies. These were played, in alphabetical order, by:-
Tyler Butterworth .... Merry Andrew
Jim Carter .... Henry Fielding
Michael Feast .... Christopher Wren
William Forde .... Young Thomas de Quincey
Tom Hollander .... T. S. Eliot
Philip Jackson .... Samuel Pepys
Derek Jacobi .... Tacitus
Alex Jennings .... Stephen Spender
Kara Kyne .... Jane Alsop
Chris Langham .... Ned Ward
Anton Lesser .... Charles Dickens
Philip Madoc .... Geoffrey of Monmouth
Joseph McFadden .... James Boswell
Tim Pigott-Smith .... John Evelyn
Amanda Root .... Charlotte Brontë
Jack Shepherd .... Thomas de Quincey
John Simm .... Friedrich Engels
Toby Stephens .... Casanova
Richard Stockwell .... Young Peter Ackroyd
Ronan Vibert .... Joseph Conrad
Harriet Walter .... Virginia Woolf
Don Warrington .... Ignatius Sancho
Timothy West .... Henry Mayhew
John Woodvine .... Henry Moore

External links

BBC television documentaries
2004 British television series debuts
2004 British television series endings
2000s British documentary television series
2000s British television miniseries
English-language television shows
Social history of London